The BC Card Cup is a Go competition in South Korea.

Outline
The BC Card Cup is a tournament for 20 young players. It is a Go title in South Korea, the equivalent to the Shinjin-O title in Japan. The tournament first started in 1990, and is still in existence after 17 years. In order to get to the final, you must win 19 games. If you lose, you are out of the tournament. The holder of the title only plays one game, in which he needs to win to enter the final of the tournament. Once the final tournament starts, it's a knockout tournament. Players with the best record in the preliminaries are seeded into the 2nd round. The players get 3 hours in total to play each game, and the komi is 6.5 points.

Past winners

See also

References

External links 

BC Card Cup